Nicholas II of Russia (1868–1918) (ruled 1894-1917) was the last emperor of Russia.

Nicholas II may also refer to:

Pope Nicholas II (c. 990/995–1061)
Nicholas II of Transylvania (1213), voivode
Nicholas II of Saint Omer (r. 1258–1294)
Patriarch Nicholas II of Alexandria (r. 1263–1276)
Nicholas II, Duke of Opava (1268–1365)
Nicholas II Garay (1367–1433)
Nicholas II, Count of Tecklenburg (died 1426)
Nicholas II Zorzi (14th–15th century)
Nicholas II of Niemodlin (c. 1462–1497)
Nicolaus II Bernoulli, Swiss mathematician (1695–1726)
Nicholas II, Prince Esterházy (1765–1833)
Crown Prince Nicholas II of Montenegro (born 1944)

See also

 Nikola II (disambiguation)
 Nicholas (disambiguation)
 Nicholas I (disambiguation)
 Nicholas III (disambiguation)